The National Order of Honour and Merit is the highest honour of merit awarded by the President of the Republic of Haiti. The Order was instituted on 28 May 1926 and is awarded in five grades to both Haitians and foreign nationals. The award is given to acknowledge distinction in not only the realms of diplomacy and politics but also the arts, charitable works and other fields of benefit or interest to Haiti.

Award
The award is a white enamel Maltese cross with laterally-pierced ball suspension. The face has a circular central medallion bearing the arms of Haiti within a blue enamel ring inscribed with the words, ‘Medaille Honneur et Merite’. The reverse with a circular central medallion is inscribed with ‘République D'Haïti’ within a blue enamel ring inscribed in gilt letters ‘Liberte Egalite Fraternite’.

Grades

Recipients

  J. Hunter Guthrie

 Grand Crosses;
  Tsai Ing-wen
  Francisco Franco
  Mauril Bélanger
  Kenneth H. Merten
  Smedley Butler
  Sean Penn
 Commanders;
  Ben Moreell

References

Orders, decorations, and medals of Haiti
Awards established in 1926